Joseph Albert Marcel Rolland Huard (September 6, 1902 – September 16, 1979) was a Canadian professional ice hockey centre who played in one National Hockey League game for the Toronto Maple Leafs during the 1930–31 season, on December 13, 1930, and became the first player to score a goal in his only NHL game. Huard would ultimately play eight seasons of pro hockey from 1926-34, primarily in the Canadian Professional Hockey League (later the International Hockey League.) He died in 1979 on a fishing trip near Maniwaki, Quebec, and was interred at Notre Dame Cemetery in Ottawa.

Career statistics

Regular season and playoffs

See also
 List of players who played only one game in the NHL

References

External links
 

1902 births
1979 deaths
Buffalo Bisons (IHL) players
Canadian ice hockey centres
Ice hockey people from Quebec
London Tecumsehs players
People from Beauharnois, Quebec
St. Louis Flyers (AHA) players
Syracuse Stars (IHL) players
Toronto Maple Leafs players
Windsor Bulldogs (CPHL) players